The Twenty-Seventh Wisconsin Legislature convened from  to  in regular session.

This was the first session since 1856 in which the Democratic Party held control of the Assembly.

Senators representing even-numbered districts were newly elected for this session and were serving the first year of a two-year term. Assembly members were elected to a one-year term. Assembly members and even-numbered senators were elected in the general election of November 4, 1873. Senators representing odd-numbered districts were serving the second year of their two-year term, having been elected in the general election held on November 5, 1872.

Major events
 January 5, 1874: Inauguration of William Robert Taylor as 12th Governor of Wisconsin.
 June 16, 1874: Wisconsin Supreme Court chief justice Luther S. Dixon resigned from the court.  Governor William Robert Taylor immediately appointed Milwaukee city attorney Edward George Ryan to become the 5th chief justice.
 July 1, 1874: The Sholes and Glidden typewriter was first marketed in the United States, it was principally designed by Wisconsin resident C. Latham Sholes.
 October 9, 1874: The Treaty of Bern was signed, establishing a General Postal Union for the coordination of international mail deliveries.
 November 25, 1874: The Greenback Party was established as a United States political party, composed mostly of farmers suffering the financial effects of the Panic of 1873.

Major legislation
 February 26, 1874: An Act to prohibit certain provisions and conditions in contracts, 1874 Act 60.  Outlawed contract terms which attempted to remove contract disputes from court jurisdiction.
 March 7, 1874: Joint Resolution providing for biennial sessions of the legislature and compensation of members, 1874 Joint Resolution 5.  Proposed an amendment to the Constitution of Wisconsin to change Assembly terms from one year to two years.  This version of the amendment would be defeated, but a later attempt at the same change would be approved in 1882.
 March 10, 1874: An Act to regulate railroads in certain respects, 1874 Act 227.  Required that railroad lines passing through populated areas must make at least one stop in that area per day.
 March 11, 1874: An Act relating to railroads, express and telegraph companies, in the state of Wisconsin, 1874 Act 273.  Implemented regulation of railroad freight and passenger rates, and established the Wisconsin Railroad Commission to enforce the new law.  Referred to in historical documents and newspapers as the "Potter Law" for its chief sponsor Robert L. D. Potter.
 March 12, 1874: An Act in relation to railroads, 1874 Act 341. Declared that all railroad lines in the state would be common carriers, and carry each others passengers and cars without discrimination.

Party summary

Senate summary

Assembly summary

Sessions
 1st Regular session: January 14, 1874March 12, 1874

Leaders

Senate leadership
 President of the Senate: Charles D. Parker (D)
 President pro tempore: John Chandler Holloway (R)

Assembly leadership
 Speaker of the Assembly: Gabriel Bouck (D)

Members

Members of the Senate
Members of the Senate for the Twenty-Seventh Wisconsin Legislature:

Members of the Assembly
Members of the Assembly for the Twenty-Seventh Wisconsin Legislature:

Employees

Senate employees
 Chief Clerk: J. H. Waggoner
 Assistant Clerk: Robert A. Gillett
 Bookkeeper: T. S. Ansley
 Engrossing Clerk: Mrs. Fannie Vilas
 Enrolling Clerk: W. L. Abbott
 Transcribing Clerk: John W. Brackett
 Clerk for the Committee on Engrossed Bills: E. S. Knight
 Clerk for the Committee on Enrolled Bills: Will Bates
 Sergeant-at-Arms: O. U. Akin
 Assistant Sergeant-at-Arms: E. J. Cole
 Postmaster: A. J. White
 Assistant Postmaster: Nils Michelet
 Doorkeeper: W. H. Bell
 Assistant Doorkeeper: M. Lynch
 Assistant Doorkeeper: M. H. Cram
 Gallery Doorkeeper: J. A. Newman
 Gallery Doorkeeper: J. K. Dunn
 Committee Room Attendant: J. Williams
 Night Watch: Fred Bright
 Lt. Governors Messenger: Wendell Paine
 Clerk's Messenger: Eddie McCurdy
 Messengers:
 Fred Richards
 Daniel Fitzpatrick
 Charlie Colvin
 Richard Murphy
 Marcus Moody

Assembly employees
 Chief Clerk: George Wilbur Peck
 Assistant Clerk: Frank Hatch
 Bookkeeper: J. W. Ryckman
 Engrossing Clerk: J. C. Eggers
 Enrolling Clerk: E. C. Enos
 Transcribing Clerk: G. J. Patton
 Sergeant-at-Arms: Joseph Deuster
 Assistant Sergeant-at-Arms: Columbus Germain
 Postmaster: Agesilaus Wilson
 Assistant Postmaster: A. S. Weil
 Doorkeepers: 
 B. S. Rollin
 Michael Kelly
 W. Hyde
 Night Watch: Bernard C. Wolter
 Fireman: Felix McLindon
 Committee Room Attendants:
 D. S. Harkness
 W. Hughes
 Richard Donovan
 Edward Flaherty
 Porter: David Goodell
 Speaker's Messenger: Clinton Snow
 Chief Clerk's Messenger: Winnie Hassell
 Sergeant-at-Arms' Messenger: Helson Bronnell
 Messengers:
 Charles Johnson
 Charles Murphy
 James Foran
 Frank Dunn
 Willie Pitman
 Charlie Whitton
 Theodore Cooper
 Walter Reyson

References

External links
 1874: Related Documents from Wisconsin Legislature

1874 in Wisconsin
Wisconsin
Wisconsin legislative sessions